Grand National is the debut extended play by British band, Courting. The EP was released on 9 April 2021 through Nice Swan Recordings.

Track listing

Critical reception 

Grand National received generally positive review from contemporary music critics. On review aggregator, Album of the Year, Grand National received an average rating of 80 out of 100 based on three critic reviews. Alex Cabré, writing for DIY described the EP as "heavy-handed with their influences but endearing enough to get away with it." Cabré compared Courting heavily to compatriot band, Sports Team, saying that "frontman Sean Murphy-O’Neill is a pint-sized Alex Rice, a cavalier jabberer whose tone is an inch the right side of irritating as he rips into horse racing culture and Brexit Britain over an instrumental that should tick a few boxes for any Sports Team fan."

Jamie MacMillan, writing for Dork praised Grand National giving it a perfect five-star rating. MacMillan called Grand National an "exciting early sound of a band trying on different outfits to see what fits."

Personnel 
 Co-producer – Sean Murphy O'Neill
 Drums, Lead Vocals, Bass Guitar, Guitar, Cowbell – Courting
 Lyrics By – Sean Murphy O'Neill
 Mastered By – Tom Woodhead
 Producer – Robert Whiteley
 Technician – Nathan Chinn
 Violin – Martha Mckay

References

External links 
 

2021 debut EPs
Courting (band) albums